Gerel Simmons (born June 11, 1993) is an American professional basketball player for Brose Bamberg of the Basketball Bundesliga (BBL). He played college basketball for Brevard College and Lincoln Memorial.

High school career
Simmons attended North Point High School in Waldorf, Maryland.

College career
Simmons played college basketball for Brevard College and Lincoln Memorial. He was selected at the first-team All-South Atlantic Conference in 2016.

Professional career
Simmons started his career with Rilski Sportist of the NBL. On March 10, 2022, he joined Ciclista Juninense in Argentina.

After a short stint in Uruguay, he joined Ibar of the Montenegrin League. He finished the year with Al-Ittihad in Libya.

The 2019-20 season, Simmons played with UMF Tindastóll and AS Douanes. The following season, he played in Germany with Artland Dragons and with San Carlos in Dominican Republic. On August 21, 2022, Simmons signed with Lucentum Alicante of the LEB Oro.

On February 27, 2022, Simmons signed with Apollon Patras of the Greek Basket League. In 10 league games, he averaged 13.8 points, 3.1 rebounds and 2.6 assists, playing around 29 minutes per contest.

On August 29, 2022, he signed with ERA Nymburk of the NBL.

On December 30, 2022, he signed with Brose Bamberg of the Basketball Bundesliga (BBL).

References

External links
Lincoln Memorial bio

1993 births
Living people
American men's basketball players
American expatriate basketball people in Argentina
American expatriate basketball people in Bulgaria
American expatriate basketball people in Iceland
American expatriate basketball people in Montenegro
American expatriate basketball people in Spain
American expatriate basketball people in Germany
American expatriate basketball people in Greece
Apollon Patras B.C. players
Basketball Nymburk players
Basketball players from Maryland
Brose Bamberg players